State Route 635 (SR 635)  is a north–south state highway in the northwestern portion of the U.S. state of Ohio. The southern terminus of SR 635 is at SR 18 in Bascom.

Route description
SR 635 travels through northwestern Seneca County and southwestern Sandusky County along its way.  The highway is not included as a part of the National Highway System, a network of highways deemed to be most important for the nation's economy, mobility and defense.

History
The designation of SR 635 took place in 1937.  Its original routing between SR 18 in Bascom and US 6 near Helena is the same one that it utilizes to this day.  No significant changes have taken place to the alignment of SR 635 since it was established.

Major intersections

References

635
Transportation in Sandusky County, Ohio
Transportation in Seneca County, Ohio